An intermediate cartridge is a rifle/carbine cartridge that has significantly greater power than a pistol cartridge but still has a reduced muzzle energy compared to fully powered cartridges (such as the  .303 British, 7.62×54mmR, 7.92×57mm Mauser, 7.7×58mm Arisaka, .30-06 Springfield, or 7.62×51mm NATO), and therefore is regarded as being "intermediate" between traditional rifle and handgun calibers.

As their recoil is significantly reduced compared to full-power cartridges, fully automatic rifles firing intermediate cartridges are relatively easy to control. This allowed for the development of the assault rifle, a type of versatile selective fire small arms that is lighter and more compact than traditional battle rifles that fire full-power cartridges.

Early intermediate cartridges to see service were the German 7.92×33mm Kurz used in the StG 44 and the .30 Carbine used in the American M2 select fire carbine during the late years and closing days of World War II.

With the data collected during World War II and the Korean War, the benefits of intermediate cartridges became apparent. This resulted in the development of "modern" cartridges such as the Soviet 7.62×39mm M43 (used in the SKS, AK-47 and AKM).
Later an international tendency emerged towards relatively small-sized, lightweight, high-velocity Intermediate military service cartridges. Cartridges like the American 5.56×45mm M193 (1964; originally used in the M16),  Soviet 5.45×39mm M74 (1974; used in the AK-74, which replaced the AKM), Belgian SS109 / 5.56×45mm NATO (1980; used in most AR-15 systems), and the Chinese 5.8×42mm (1987; used in the QBZ-95) allow a soldier to carry more ammunition for the same weight compared to their larger and heavier predecessor cartridges, have favourable maximum point-blank range or "battle zero" characteristics and produce relatively low bolt thrust and free recoil impulse, favouring lightweight arms design and automatic fire accuracy.

History

High power rounds
The late 19th and early 20th century saw the introduction of smokeless powder cartridges with small caliber jacketed spitzer bullets that extended the effective range of fire beyond the limitations of the open rifle sights. The Maxim gun, the world's first machine gun, was devised in 1885, and a year later, the Lebel Model 1886 rifle had the distinction of being the world's first smokeless powder bolt-action rifle.

In the years leading up to World War I, the Lebel set an international example, and smokeless powder high power service cartridges and service rifles began to be produced by all the world's great powers. This included, but was not limited to, the German Gewehr 98, the British Lee–Enfield, the Russian Mosin–Nagant, and the American M1903 Springfield.

Introduction of semi- and full-auto weapons as service firearms
World War II revealed the demand for better fire density in infantry operations. To achieve this goal, both Allied and Axis countries rapidly developed and produced a number of semi-automatic service rifles, such as American M1 Garand, Soviet SVT-40 and the German Gewehr 43. Compared to their bolt-action predecessors, these weapons provided a considerably higher effective fire rate. Therefore,  is considered the maximum effective range, even though the rifle is accurate at much greater ranges".

Simultaneously, armies of both sides had put submachine guns to extensive use. Soviet PPSh-41 and PPS-43, US Thompson, British Sten and the German MP-40 had an even higher fire rate (and thus higher fire density) compared to larger-caliber semi auto rifles, but their effective range was considerably shorter: e.g., 164 yd vs 500 yd for Thompson and M1 Garand, respectively. SMG, chambered in pistol calibers (7.62x25, 9x19 Parabellum and .45 ACP) lacked penetration provided by larger and faster rifle bullets.

Seeking to combine the rapid fire capabilities of SMG and advantages of the rifle calibers, both Allied and Axis powers developed a range of early automatic rifles. First automatic rifles to be adopted by the fighting armies were the German FG42 and Sturmgewehr 44.

Demand for lighter ammunition
Although efficient in the battlefield, early automatic rifles had a considerable drawback compared to both semi-automatic rifles and submachine guns. With a fire rate of 600-1000 rounds per minute, automatic rifles increased the amount of ammo a soldier had to carry. However, the ammo was much heavier (393 gr (25.4 g) for 7.62 x 51 round compared to 160 gr (10.4 g) for .45 ACP), effectively limiting the ammo load.

Additionally, when fired in full automatic mode free recoil delivered by full-sized and full-powered cartridges became an issue, too.

Though technically a full-powered cartridge, the first one to fulfil this requirement may have been the Japanese 6.5×50mm Arisaka used by the Russian Fedorov Avtomat rifle, used in limited numbers from 1915 to 1917 (the cartridge itself dates back to 1897). The Fedorov was arguably the first assault rifle.

This led to a series of early attempts to produce a lower-powered round using existing calibers. Examples include the US .30 Carbine cartridge for the M1 Carbine and the German 7.92×33mm Kurz, a shortened version of the standard 7.92×57mm Mauser round used in the StG-44, which is more commonly considered to be the first assault rifle. The Soviets developed a similar round, the 7.62×39mm, for the SKS but far better known as the round for the post-war AK-47.

Post-war developments
These earlier examples were generally developed with the goal being ease of development and logistics, and lacked any rigorous study of their performance. In the immediate post-war era, the British Army began such a study with an eye to replacing their pre-World War I .303 British. The .303 had been slated for replacement repeatedly, but a series of events kept it in service decades longer than expected. Their studies led to a new purpose-designed intermediate round, the .280 British, along with new weapons to fire it. The round attracted significant interest among other UK-oriented forces, but during NATO standardization effort the US was dead-set against any reduction in power. The British EM-2 bullpup rifle used an intermediate round, and was issued in limited numbers in the 1950s but the 7.62×51mm NATO was selected and it was removed from service.

In practice, the 7.62×51mm NATO was found to be too powerful for select-fire weapons, as the British testing had warned. When the US entered the Vietnam War they were armed with the semi-automatic M14 rifle while facing increasing numbers of full-automatic AK-47s. Demands for a select-fire weapon were constant but the Army was slow to respond. An ARPA program cleared the way for small numbers of a new and much smaller round, the .223 Remington, to be introduced to combat by special forces. Field reports were extremely favorable, leading to the introduction of the M16 rifle.

Universal service cartridge
Some militaries have considered the adoption of a 'universal service cartridge' – a replacement of small caliber, high-velocity intermediate cartridges and full-power cartridges with a cartridge at the larger end of the intermediate cartridge spectrum, well suited for both assault rifle and general-purpose machine gun use in the 6mm to 7mm caliber range, with external and terminal ballistic performance close or equal to the 7.62×51mm NATO and 7.62×54mmR full-power cartridges.

The US Army conducted testing of telescoped ammunition, polymer-cased ammunition, and caseless ammunition for future service cartridges. As of 2022, the candidate for US Army universal cartridge is the 6.8×51mm Common Cartridge, selected by the US Next Generation Squad Weapon Program. This cartridge has a muzzle energy even higher than 7.62×51mm NATO.

Characteristics
Typical intermediate cartridges have:
 Bottlenecked, rimless cartridge
  According to the official C.I.P. (Commission Internationale Permanente pour l'Epreuve des Armes à Feu Portatives) and NATO EPVAT rulings the maximum service pressures range between  Pmax piezo pressure
 Muzzle energies ranging between 
 Muzzle velocities ranging between 
 Relatively low Oratios ranging between 2.87 and 7.99

List of intermediate cartridges

Service cartridges
Service cartridges are cartridges the service rifles of armies were or are chambered for.
5.45×39mm cartridge of the AK-74 assault rifle
5.56×45mm NATO (.223 Remington) of the M16 assault rifle and M4 carbine
5.8×42mm cartridge of the QBZ-95 assault rifle
.30 Carbine (7.62×33mm) cartridge of the US M2 select fire carbine and M1 semi-automatic carbine
7.62×39mm cartridge of the AK-47 assault rifle and  SKS semi-automatic carbine
7.62×45mm cartridge of the vz. 52 semi-automatic rifle
7.92×33mm Kurz cartridge of the StG 44 assault rifle

Prototype cartridges

4.85×49mm cartridge of the experimental Enfield IW assault rifle
6×45mm SAW cartridge of the experimental Rodman Laboratories XM235 light machine gun, a project which terminated in the M249
6.5×39mm cartridge based on the 7.62×39mm of variants of the AR-15 and Zastava M70 assault rifles
6.8mm Remington SPC (6.8×43mm) cartridge of the limited service LWRC M6 assault rifle
.280 British (7×43mm) cartridge of experimental weapons and the briefly in  service EM-2 assault rifle
7.5×38mm Swiss trials Cartridge Stgw Patrone 47
7.5×38mm chambered for the CEAM Modèle 1950 rifle and experimental French variant of StG 45(M) rifle
7.65×33mm Argentine variant of German 7.92×33mm cartridge for use in Argentine copy of German Sturmgewehr 44 assault rifle
7.65×35mm chambered in CEAM Modèle 1950 and experimental French variant of the StG 45(M) rifle
7.75×39mm GeCo the first intermediate round ever made, German experiment
12.7×55mm STs-130 subsonic cartridge of the limited service ShAK-12 assault/battle rifle

See also
 List of assault rifles
 Table of handgun and rifle cartridges
 Fully powered cartridge

References

External links
 Assault Rifles and their Ammunition: History and Perspectives 

Cartridge families